Deep Sea World is an aquarium located in the village of North Queensferry, in Fife, Scotland. It is host to a collection of large sand tiger sharks, also known as ragged toothed sharks or grey nurse sharks, and various other species of shark.

History

The aquarium opened on 9 April 1993 in the site of the disused Battery Quarry, below the Forth Rail Bridge. It is owned and operated by the Spanish Aspro Ocio Group, who also run the Blue Planet Aquarium in England and many other aquaria in Europe.

Exhibits

The tank with the tunnel contains  of sea water pumped in from the River Forth. Because of the low temperature most animals within the tunnel are from around Britain. Sand tiger sharks are generally found in warmer water, for example Florida, US and South Africa. They easily adapt to the change in temperature, but the lower temperature reduces the rate of metabolism.

The aquarium also displays various tanks and rock pools containing exotic fish and other sea animals.

In 2005, the aquarium opened a new seal enclosure which houses resident seals as well as injured ones rescued by the SSPCA.

References

External links

Tourist attractions in Fife
Aquaria in the United Kingdom
1993 establishments in Scotland
Aspro Parks attractions